Gluvreklett Glacier is a glacier flowing northwest between Von Essen Mountain and Terningskarvet Mountain in the Gjelsvik Mountains of Queen Maud Land, Antarctica. It was photographed from the air by the Third German Antarctic Expedition (1938–39). It was mapped by Norwegian cartographers from surveys and photos by the Norwegian–British–Swedish Antarctic Expedition (1949–52) and the Norwegian expedition (1958–59) and named Gluvreklettbreen.

See also
 List of glaciers in the Antarctic
 Glaciology

References

Glaciers of Queen Maud Land
Princess Martha Coast